Defibaugh Tavern, also known as Willow Grove Tavern, is a historic tavern building located at Snake Spring Township in Bedford County, Pennsylvania. It was built about 1785, and is a -story, log-and-frame building with a double stacked porch.  The original section was built of logs and it was expanded in the early 19th century.  It has a -story frame kitchen ell.  Also on the property is a small log barn dated to the 18th century.

It was listed on the National Register of Historic Places in 1992.

External links 
 Vintage Aerial showing the tavern: 86A-WBE-14

References 

Commercial buildings on the National Register of Historic Places in Pennsylvania
Commercial buildings completed in 1785
Buildings and structures in Bedford County, Pennsylvania
Vernacular architecture in Pennsylvania
National Register of Historic Places in Bedford County, Pennsylvania